Chaetohermetia is a genus of flies in the family Stratiomyidae.

Species
Chaetohermetia apicalis Lindner, 1929
Chaetohermetia insularis James, 1977

References

Stratiomyidae
Brachycera genera
Taxa named by Erwin Lindner
Diptera of North America
Diptera of South America